= Keller's 10 =

- Origin: Switzerland
- Genres: Experimental jazz
- Years active: 2006–present
- Label: Unit Records
- Members: Beat Keller; Reto Anneler; Rafael Schilt; Rafael Baier; Linus Hunkeler; Yannick Barman; Bernhard Bamert; Fabian Beck; Peter Zihlmann; Peter Gossweiler; Marius Peyer
- Past members: Claudio Bergamin; Matthias Tschopp; Andreas Meili; Michael Flury; Mats Spillmann
- Website: Kellers10.Ch

Keller's 10 is a ten-strong Swiss band, led by composer and conductor Beat Keller. Their music can be classed as jazz, avant-garde, experimental, rock, New Orleans jazz, ambient and manic polka.

== History ==
The band was founded in 2006 by Winterthur-based guitar player, multi-instrumentalist and composer Beat Keller. In 2008 they released their debut album, which was widely acclaimed within the jazz community. The well renowned jazz site All About Jazz picked the album as the «Best Debut Release 2008». In 2013 Keller's 10 won the second place at the «Moods Jazz & Blues Award». In 2013 the band released their second studio album called Two.

== Discography ==
- Keller’s 10 (2008) Unit Records
- Two (2013) Unit Records
